Killenworth is a historic mansion in Glen Cove, New York constructed for George Dupont Pratt in 1912. It was purchased by the Soviet Union in 1946 to become the country retreat of the Soviet, and later Russian, delegation to the United Nations. In the 1980s the property was subject to allegations it was being used for espionage. There has been a long-standing conflict with the City of Glen Cove over its tax status.

History

Construction

Killenworth was constructed in 1912 as the home of George Dupont Pratt.  The building was designed by Trowbridge and Ackerman in the Tudor Revival style with a seam-faced granite facade and had 39 rooms. It won first prize in that year's American Institute of Architects competition for best country house. The estate's gardens were designed by James Leal Greenleaf, and were considered his greatest achievement.  The current building replaced an earlier mansion, also called Killenworth, which was constructed for Pratt around 1897 by William Tubby, with landscaping by the Olmsted Brothers.

Killenworth is one of five existing mansions in Glen Cove built for the sons of oil magnate Charles Pratt. The others are "The Braes", now the Webb Institute of Naval Architecture; "Welwyn", now the Holocaust Memorial and Tolerance Center of Nassau County on the grounds of the Welwyn Preserve; "Poplar Hill", now the Glengariff Healthcare Center; and "The Manor", now the Glen Cove Mansion Hotel and Conference Center. Their property totaled nearly 5,000 acres.

Diplomatic retreat
In 1946, the estate was purchased by the Soviet Union and used as the country retreat of its delegation to the United Nations. 

The presence of the Russians made the property the target of demonstrations, requiring the City of Glen Cove to provide additional police protection that was not reimbursed. When Soviet leader Nikita Khrushchev visited Killenworth in 1960, crowds reportedly threw tomatoes at his party's limousines. Other residents simply watched the procession in silence. Cuban leader Fidel Castro also visited Killenworth in Glen Cove while in the United States.

The tax-exempt status of the property led to conflict with the City of Glen Cove, which in 1970 attempted to foreclose on the property until the United States Department of State got a restraining order in federal court to stop the proceedings. In the 1980s the facility was subject to allegations that it was being used for espionage, with defector Arkady Shevchenko stating that its top floors were occupied by equipment for signals intelligence.  In response to this and the tax dispute, in 1982 the city council voted to revoke the Russians' ability to get permits for city beach, golf, and tennis facilities. The Soviet Union retaliated by denying use of a Moscow beach to members of the Embassy of the United States in Moscow. The permit revocation was reversed in 1984.

In December 2016, the Obama administration announced that two Russian diplomatic facilities, one of which was on Long Island, would be closed as part of the retaliation for the Russian interference in the 2016 United States presidential election. It was initially reported that Killenworth might be the Long Island site, but the designated facility turned out to be another mansion owned by the Russians called Norwich House in nearby Upper Brookville, New York. Killenworth is still used by the Russian delegation.

References

External links
 

1912 establishments in New York (state)
Mansions of Gold Coast, Long Island
Glen Cove, New York
Russian ambassadorial residences
Soviet Union and the United Nations
Russia and the United Nations
Soviet Union–United States relations
Russia–United States relations